Baccio is an Italian masculine given name, the diminutive form of the name Bartolommeo. Notable people with the name include:

Bartolommeo Bandinelli, Florentine Mannerist sculptor
Baccio D'Agnolo (Bartolomeo Bagglioni), Florentine Renaissance sculptor and architect
Baccio Pontelli, Florentine Renaissance architect
Baccio Baldini, Renaissance engraver
Baccio Ciarpi, Tuscan Mannerist painter
Baccio della Porta, Florentine Renaissance painter also known as Fra Bartolommeo
Baccio del Bianco (1604-1657), Florentine architect, engineer, scenic designer and painter
Baccio da Montelupo, Italian Renaissance sculptor

See also
 Bart (disambiguation)

Italian masculine given names